Mentanarvirðisløn Landsins (Faroese Cultural Prize) has been awarded by the Faroese government to Faroese writers, musicians, artists etc. since 1998. In 2004 no award was given. From 1998 to 2000 only one award was given, but in 2001 they established an additional award, half as big as the original.

The prize is awarded by a board appointed by the Ministry of Culture. The board also gives additional special awards of 50.000 Danish Koroner and/or so-called sømdargávur or Sømdargáva landsins (grants), given as a lifelong annual grant of DKK 20 000. The main award, Mentanarvirðisløn landsins, is DKK 150.000, and the heiðursgáva landsins (award of honour) is DKK 75.000 koroner.

In 2011 the awards were announced in December, with the next awards announced on 15 January 2013, which was William Heinesen's birthday. This was also the first time that the event was held in Klaksvík, being announced in Spaniastova and broadcast live on national Faroese radio. The following year the prizes were handed out on 15 January in Stóra Pakkhús (The Large Storage House) in Vágur.

Awarded cultural persons

Mentanarvirðisløn landsins – Faroese Cultural Prize 

The main award, the Mentanarvirðisløn landsins (Faroese Cultural Award), is DDK 150.000. These persons have won the award since it started in 1998:
 2020 – Sigrun Gunnarsdóttir
 2019 – Hanus G. Johansen
 2018 –  Bárður Jákupsson
 2017 –  Barbara í Gongini
 2016 – Rúni Brattaberg
 2015 – Annika Hoydal
 2014 – Tórbjørn Olsen
 2013 – Tróndur Patursson, artist
 2012 – Tóroddur Poulsen, poet, writer, artist and musician
 2011 – Jóanes Nielsen, writer and poet
 2010 – Sunleif Rasmussen, composer
 2009 – Kári Leivsson (Kári P.), poet and singer/songwriter
 2008 – Ebba Hentze, writer
 2006 – Zacharias Heinesen, artist (painter)
 2005 – Tita Vinther, artist
 2004 – No award given
 2003 – Hanus Kamban, short story writer and translator
 2002 – Gunnar Hoydal, writer
 2001 – Eyðun Johannessen, actor and theatre director
 2000 – Ingálvur av Reyni, artist (painter)
 1999 – Jens Pauli Heinesen, novelist, short story writer and poet
 1998 – Regin Dahl, poet and composer

Heiðursgáva landsins – Faroese Award of Honour 

Heiðursgáva landsins is DKK 75.000. These persons and cultural institutions have received the award since 2001:

 2019 – Simme Arge Jacobsen
 2018 – Astrid Andreasen
 2017 – Frits Johannesen
 2016 – Steinprent
 2015 – Jákup Pauli Gregoriussen, architect
 2014 –  Tey av Kamarinum
 2013 – Árni Dahl, writer, editor
 2012 – Marianne Clausen
 2011 – Kristian Blak, Danish/Faroese composer, musician and owner of TUTL record company
 2010 – Jonhard Mikkelsen, who started Sprotin, which publishes Faroese books. He has written and published several Faroese dictionaries
 2009 – Laura Joensen, theatre actor
 2008 – Martin Tórgarð, who got the award for his work with the Faroese chain dance and his gifts as skipari of the Faroese dance. (Skipari means skipper or captain, a title given to the person who leads the dance and starts the singing of every verse.)
 2007 – No award given
 2006 – Jógvan Isaksen, crime fiction writer. He is also the head of Mentunargrunnur Studentafelagsins, which is a Faroese publishing house in Copenhagen.
 2005 – Emil Juul Thomsen
 2004 – No award given
 2003 – Ólavur Hátún
 2002 – Axel Tórgarð
 2001 – Fuglafjarðar Sjónleikarafelag

Other Special Awards 
The board can give a special award of DKK 50.000 if they think it appropriate. These persons have received the award:

Award to Young artist – (Virðisløn til ungt listafólk) 

 2019 – No award given
 2018 – Búi Rouch, dancer og choreographer
 2017 – Konni Kass, singer and songwriter.
 2016 – Anna Malan Jógvansdóttir, poet
 2015 – Andrias Høgenni, film director
 2014 – Mathias Kapnas, musician
 2013 – Trygvi Danielsen, writer and musician
 2012 – Silja Strøm – young artist
 2011 – Sakaris Stórá – young film director (25 years old in 2011)

Málrøktarvirðisløn Landsins – Award for exceptional work on the Faroese Language 
 2010 – Jóhan Hendrik Winther Poulsen, linguist

Serstøk virðisløn – Special Award 

This special award is DKK 50.000. These persons have received the award:

 2019 – The publication house Leirkerið with the brothers Zacharias Zachariasen and Flóvin Tyril
 2006 – Jón Hilmar Magnússon
 2001 – Ebba Hentze, children's writer

Sømdargáva landsins 
Sømdargáva lansins (Faroese Grant) is DKK 20.000, an annual subsidy for the rest of their lives.
 2015 - Alexandur Kristiansen
 2014 - Oddvør Johansen
 2014 - Katrin Ottarsdóttir
 2012 – Ebba Hentze
 2012 – Hanus G. Johansen
 2012 – Guðrið Poulsen

See also

 List of awards for contributions to culture
 Faroese Literature Prize

References

External links 
 Logir.fo KUNNGERÐ NR. 90 FRÁ 28. OKTOBER 2008 UM STUÐUL TIL MENTAN OG LIST (Faroese law about financial support of Faroese culture and art)

Faroese literature
Awards established in 1998
Awards for contributions to culture
Faroese literary awards
Winter events in the Faroe Islands